The prevalence of illegal drug use in the Philippines is lower than the global average, according to the United Nations Office on Drugs and Crime (UNODC). President Rodrigo Duterte has claimed that the country could become a "narco-state". Two of the most used and valuable illegal drugs in the country are methamphetamine hydrochloride (known locally as shabu) and marijuana. In 2012, the United Nations said the Philippines had the highest rate of methamphetamine use in East Asia, and according to a U.S. State Department report, 2.1 percent of Filipinos aged 16 to 64 use the drug based on 2008 figures by the Philippines Dangerous Drugs Board. As of 2016, the United Nations Office of Drugs and Crime report that 1.1 percent of Filipinos aged 10 to 69 use the drug. In Metro Manila, most barangays are affected by illegal drugs.

History of government response

Gloria Macapagal Arroyo
The goal and strategy of the campaign against illegal drugs by the administration of President Gloria Macapagal Arroyo was outlined in the Letter of Instruction (LOI) No. 1 issued by the president on July 4, 2001.

The Comprehensive Dangerous Drugs Act was signed into law by Arroyo in 2002 superseding the Dangerous Drugs Act of 1972.

Benigno Aquino III
Under President Benigno Aquino III's term, 77,810 people were arrested by government authorities in connection with the illegal drug trade.

Aquino cooperated with Mexico and China in combatting the illegal drug trade.

Rodrigo Duterte

Rodrigo Duterte, after his inauguration on June 30, 2016, called a speech full of swearing in Tondo, Manila, and urged people to kill drug pushers in exchange for bounty.

Arrests
Most arrests related to illegal drugs involves users of methamphetamine hydrochloride (shabu).

Involvement of government officials and employees
From 2010 to 2015, 623 government officials and employees were arrested for drug possession, according to the Philippine Drug Enforcement Agency (PDEA). Of these, 45% were government employees while 30% were elected officials and 25% were police. Several government officials have been arrested for drug possession, like former PDEA Special Enforcement Service director and Lieutenant Colonel Ferdinand Marcelino but released months later after some clarification in the ongoing investigation.

There are also  Philippine National Police generals allegedly involved in the drug trade. On July 5, 2016, President Rodrigo Duterte named five generals alleged to be involved in drugs: Marcelo Garbo Jr., Joel Pagdilao, Edgardo Tinio, Bernardo Diaz, and Vic Loot. All five deny involvement in illegal drugs. In 2013, then Criminal Investigation and Detection Group Chief turned Baguio Mayor Benjamin Magalong discovered an alleged case of recycling of methamphetamine hydrocloride worth PHP648 million and setting a drug lord free during an anti-drug operation in Mexico, Pampanga. In a 2019 Senate hearing, Magalong alleged that then PNP Chief Oscar Albayalde, who was then the Pampanga Provincial Director when the incident happened, was involved in the operation. PDEA Director Aaron Aquino, who was a Central Luzon Police Chief, testified that he was asked by Albayalde not to implement the dismissal of the cops involved in the operations and often profited along with the cops involved. The revelations caused the resignation of Albayalde on October 14, 2019.

In his I am sorry for my country speech, President Duterte revealed the names of 150 government officials allegedly involved in the illegal drug trade. There have also been allegations of government officials' involvement in illegal drug trade at the New Bilibid Prison.

Deaths
A week after Rodrigo Duterte was inaugurated on June 30, 2016, it was reported that about 1,000 drug pushers and users had been killed in police operations and around 1,000 killed in drug-related incidents. A March 2017 INCSR report by the United States State Department estimated that 6000 extrajudicial killings had resulted from "police actions and vigilantism".

The total number of deaths associated with the war on drugs fluctuates depending on the source. In June 2019, the government reported a death toll of 5,526 deaths of "drug personalities." While in that same month a former police chief reported that the number was closer to 6,700. In December 2018, the country's Commission on Human Rights (CHR) estimated that death toll could be as high as 27,000. Police told local media in March 2019 that since the drug war was launched, there were approximately 29,000 killings, of which 3,062 or about 9.47 percent were illegal drug-related.

Criticism
Ifugao congressman Teodoro Baguilat and Senator Leila de Lima called for an investigation on the cases of killings of drug pushers by police, due to the alarming rise of deaths of drug pushers in police operations. Baguilat expressed concerns on the rising number of deaths of drug pushers and users that if the rate of deaths of drug pushers and users continue to increase, people will soon be involved in killing suspected drug personalities.

International criticism of Duterte's war on drugs include the UN, and a joint declaration on behalf of 40 states led by Iceland which includes Australia, Austria, Belgium, Bulgaria, Canada, Croatia, Cyprus, Czech Republic, Denmark, Estonia, Finland, France, Georgia, Germany, Greece, Iceland, Ireland, Italy, Latvia, Liechtenstein, Lithuania, Luxembourg, Macedonia, Malta, Moldova, Montenegro, Norway, Poland, Portugal, Romania, Slovakia, Spain, Sweden, Switzerland, The Netherlands, United Kingdom, Ukraine, and the United States.

The European Union has continuously stressed in its dialogue with the Philippines that the country must fulfil its obligations under the international conventions. It has also been noted that the alleged cases of extrajudicial killings as a result of the war on drugs and the reintroduction of capital punishment will be taken into account in the GSP+ monitoring process and the review of the Philippines’ implementation of the GSP+. In this respect, European Trade Commissioner, Cecilia Malmström, in March 2017 expressed the EU's concerns about the abusive policies on drugs and warned that the country could lose its GSP+ preferences due to these human rights violations. Similarly, the European Parliament urged the Commission to take action and consider the withdrawal of GSP+ preferences if the situation does not improve. As a result of the war on drugs, the European Commission in a 2020 document, expressed concern about the Philippines' decline in the 2018 Global Impunity Index the Philippines was listed as having the 5th highest impunity level among the 69 countries investigated around the world. The World Justice Project (WJP) Rule of Law Index 2019 ranks the Philippines amongst the lowest, ranking 90th out of 126 countries, compared to the 2017 to 2018 index, where the Philippines took 88th place out of 113 countries. The Philippines also placed at the bottom of the roster for East Asia and the Pacific region, ranking 13th out of 15, ahead only of Myanmar and Cambodia. It ranked 14th out of 30 among lower middle income countries. The EU document also noted the concerns held by Reporters Without Borders (RSF) who reported four journalists killed in line of work in 2017. It classifies Philippines as one of the five deadliest countries for journalists (in 2018 it was ranked no. 6). Including the fact that the 2019 World Press Freedom index also downgraded the Philippines, at 134th out of 180 nations (compared to 133rd in 2018 and 127th in 2017).

The New Zealand government has repeatedly spoken to Duterte regarding his war on drugs across several administrations and there was some consideration in barring Duterte from a layover arrival in New Zealand following the 2016 APEC summit in Peru, due to his human rights record.

A 2019 award-winning joint production by PBS and the BBC, On The President's Orders highlights the war on drugs in the Philippines produced and directed by two-time Emmy Award-winning and five-time BAFTA-nominated director James Jones, also filmed and directed by Emmy Award-winner for cinematography Olivier Sarbil. Reuters also covered the war on drugs with their 2018 Pulitzer Prize winning special report, Duterte's War, by Clare Baldwin, Andrew Marshall and Manuel Mogato.

Support
The New People's Army is against Duterte's war against drugs, especially on government officials, police, and the military until the present. A poll released in September 2019 found that the war on drugs has an 82% satisfaction rate among Filipino citizens. Additionally, in that same poll, Duterte's approval rating was at 78%.

Production

Marijuana

In September 2019, rapper Marlon Peroramas, better known by his stage name "Loonie" and 4 others were arrested on a buy-bust operation in Poblacion, Makati. The group was in possession of 15 sachets of high-grade marijuana with a street value of P100,000. (US$1,928.64)

Methamphetamine production
Drug syndicates have been producing methamphetamine in small-scale and kitchen-type laboratories to avoid detection by the Philippine authorities since 2010. Usually, drug syndicates rent warehouses for use as drug laboratories. These syndicates have moved towards renting houses in private subdivisions, condominiums and apartments to be used as bases for their illegal drug production. Private properties are becoming more favorable to drug syndicates as sites of illegal drug production.

Methamphetamine remains more feasible to sell in the Philippines than cocaine, a more costly illegal drug.

Owing to its geographical location, international drug syndicates use the Philippines as a transit hub for the illegal drug trade. Some local drug syndicates are also involved in the international illegal drug trade, and utilize drug mules to transport small amounts of illegal drugs to other countries. Some overseas Filipino workers have been utilized by drug syndicates as drug mules, either knowingly or unknowingly. Most Filipino drug mules, mainly women, are sent to China, where drug convicts will face execution via lethal injection. Ninoy Aquino International Airport has been identified as a favorable illegal drug trafficking hub.

Some Filipinos choose to be involved in drug trafficking due to the promise of a high income. Some still participate in such illicit activity because they are forced by certain circumstances. There were reports in the past that some Filipinos, usually women, were forced and blackmailed by drug syndicates to work as drug couriers, and if they refused, their family's safety would be compromised.

A Manila-based firm, Pacific Strategies & Assessments, identified the Philippines as, "not only a transhipment point, but also a key producer of synthetic drugs for all of Asia" in a report made in 2009.

In December 2013, the Philippine National Police – Anti-Illegal Drugs Special Operations Task Force and the Philippine Drug Enforcement confirmed reports that the Mexican Sinaloa Cartel had started operations in the country. Methamphetamine has also been manufactured in North Korea and brought into the Philippines.

Chinese cartel involvement
About nine Chinese drug cartels are involved on most illegal drug trade in the Philippines. The U.S. Department of State found out that Chinese drug cartels are behind the trade of methamphetamine hydrochloride on the Philippines.

The president divulged the names of the members of a large Chinese triad group in an interview with PTV-4 on July 7. The members of the triad group included Chinese drug lords, namely Wu Tuan, aka tatay Co, Jameson Ching, Peter Lim, aka tiger balm, and Herbert Colangco, with the three under the protection of Marcelo Garbo Jr, one of the Philippine National Police generals named by Duterte on July 5.

Mexican cartel involvement 
In a raid on a small cock-fighting operation in Lipa city, officials found 84 kilograms of methamphetamine also known by the locals as "shabu." In the raid three affiliates of the Sinaloa Cartel were arrested, the Sinaloa Cartel being led by drug lord Joaquin "El Chapo" Guzman.

Trade value
According to a 2010 U.S. International Narcotics Control Strategy Report the Philippine Drug Enforcement Agency's Director General estimated that the value of the illegal drug trade in the Philippines to be worth $6.4 to $8.4 billion annually.

Party drugs
MDMA (ecstasy), one of the party drugs, is the third most abused drug, next to cannabis and methamphetamine.

The Philippine Drug Enforcement Agency discovered the production of "fly high", after a raid on a condominium unit in Makati. The effects of use of fly high includes sleeplessness, loss of appetite, and high libido.

In May 2019, 39 bricks of cocaine valued at around 4 million were found by fishermen in the Philippines. While officials believe that this cocaine was in transit to Australia, Philippine Drug Enforcement Agency believes this was intended to be a diversion.

Drug use among minors
Inhalants are commonly used among minors, especially street children. Street children in the Philippines are most likely to be inhalant abusers.

Philippine Drug Enforcement Agency statistics of 2014 recorded 40% of minors arrested for drug possession, 
and drug syndicates use children as drug pushers. Children arrested for drug possession or use are brought to the Department of Social Welfare and Development (DSWD), in compliance to Republic Act No. 9344 (Juvenile Justice and Welfare Act of 2006).

See also
Comprehensive Dangerous Drugs Act of 2002
Close-Up Forever Summer concert tragedy
Philippine Drug War

General:
 Crime in the Philippines
 Illegal firearm trade in the Philippines

Notes

References

External links
Philippine Drug Enforcement Agency official website

Philippines
Crime in the Philippines by type
Drugs in the Philippines
Philippines